Sandy Henny Walsh (born 14 March 1995) is a professional footballer who plays as a right-back for Belgian Pro League club Mechelen. Born in Belgium, he represented the Netherlands at youth international level.

Club career
Walsh spent time in the youth sides of Tempo Overijse and ERC Hoeilaart before joining Anderlecht in 2003 where he stayed until 2011 when he joined Genk. On 2 September 2012, he made his professional debut for Genk, coming on as a substitute for the final moments of a 2–2 draw with his former side Anderlecht in the Belgian Pro League.

He moved to Zulte Waregem in the summer of 2017, making his league debut on 5 August 2017 as a substitute in a 2–0 win over Sint-Truiden.

In October 2020, he moved to another Belgian club Mechelen. He making his league debut on 1 November 2020 as a starter in a 2–2 draw over Club Brugge. He scored the only goal in the quarter-final of the Belgian Cup in injury time against Kortijk, sending Mechelen to the semi-finals.

International career
Walsh has represented the Netherlands at youth international and won the UEFA European Under-17 Championship with the under-17 side in 2012. He has represented the Netherlands at every level from under-15 to under-20. 

In November 2022, Walsh received a call-up from the Indonesian coach Shin Tae-Yong for a training camp in preparation for the 2022 AFF Championship.

Personal life
Walsh was born in Belgium to an English-born father of Irish descent who came from a Somali-South African family, and a Swiss-born Dutch-raised mother of Indonesian descent. He is therefore eligible for either Belgium, England, Ireland, Switzerland, Netherlands, Indonesia, South Africa or Somalia.

On 17 November 2022, Walsh officially acquired Indonesian citizenship.

Career statistics

Club

Honours

Club
Genk
 Belgian Cup: 2012–13
 Belgian Super Cup: 2011–12; runner-up 2013

Zulte Waregem
 Belgian Super Cup runner-up: 2017

International
Netherlands U-17
 UEFA European Under-17 Championship: 2012

References

External links
 Netherlands profile

1995 births
Living people
Indo people
Footballers from Brussels
Dutch footballers
Indonesian footballers
Association football defenders
Netherlands youth international footballers
Belgian footballers
Dutch people of English descent
Dutch people of Irish descent
Dutch people of Indonesian descent
Dutch people of Javanese descent
Belgian people of English descent
Belgian people of Irish descent
Belgian people of Indonesian descent
K.R.C. Genk players
S.V. Zulte Waregem players
Belgian Pro League players
Belgian people of Swiss descent
 Indonesian expatriate footballers
Naturalised citizens of Indonesia